Dirk Müller (born 4 August 1973 in Bad Hersfeld) is a German former cyclist. He won the German National Road Race Championships in 2006.

Major results

1993
 1st Stage 2 Bayern-Rundfahrt
1994
 3rd Overall Cinturón a Mallorca
1995
 1st  Overall Sachsen Tour
 5th Overall Regio-Tour
1996
 1st Rund um den Sachsenring
 1st Stage 5 Giro delle Regioni
 1st Prologue Niedersachsen-Rundfahrt
 3rd Overall Sachsen Tour
1997
 1st Prologue Bayern Rundfahrt
 1st Rund um die Hainleite
1998
 1st Prologue & Stage 2 Bayern Rundfahrt
 1st Stage 7 Sachsen Tour
 3rd Overall Tour de Luxembourg
1999
 2nd Sparkassen Giro Bochum
 3rd National Time Trial Championships
2000
 2nd Hel van het Mergelland
 7th Overall Regio-Tour
2006
 1st  National Road Race Championships
 1st Rund um die Sparkasse
 2nd Grote Prijs Jef Scherens
 9th Overall Sachsen-Tour
2007
 1st Köln-Schuld-Frechen
 1st Berlin-Bad Freienwald-Berlin
2008
 1st  Overall Cinturón a Mallorca
1st stage 5
 1st  Overall Grand Prix of Sochi
1st Stages 1 & 3
 1st Stage 5 Troféu Joaquim Agostinho
 2nd Prague–Karlovy Vary–Prague
 3rd Overall Circuit des Ardennes
 4th Beverbeek Classic
 8th GP Triberg-Schwarzwald
2009
 1st Rund um den Sachsenring
 2nd Overall Cinturón a Mallorca
 2nd Tour de Seoul
 3rd Overall Five Rings of Moscow
 3rd Overall Sachsen-Tour
 4th Sparkassen Münsterland Giro
 5th Overall Flèche du Sud
2010
 1st  Overall Tour of China
1st Prologue & Stage 5
 1st Pomerania Tour
 2nd Münsterland Giro
 2nd Mumbai Cyclothon
 3rd Szlakiem Grodów Piastowskich
 7th Overall Tour de Seoul
 10th Overall Czech Cycling Tour
2011
 8th Overall Tour of China
2012
 3rd Overall Tour de Taiwan
 3rd Overall Five Rings of Moscow
 5th Grand Prix of Moscow
 6th Overall Tour of Fuzhou
 8th Overall Tour of China II

References

1973 births
Living people
People from Bad Hersfeld
Sportspeople from Kassel (region)
German male cyclists
German cycling road race champions
Cyclists from Hesse
20th-century German people